Magnifica may refer to:

 Mitra magnifica, a sea snail species
 Myristica magnifica, a plant species endemic to India
 Magnifica 70, a 2015 Brazilian drama TV series

See also
La Magnifica, Mexican professional wrestler
Magnificat (disambiguation)